The Deodoro class were two French-designed and built coastal defense battleships built for the Brazilian Navy in the late 1890s. Upon their completion, Scientific American called them small vessels of a type "built only for second-rate naval powers," but also noted that it was a "wonder ... so much armor and armament could be carried" on a ship of its size. They served the Brazilian Navy as its only modern armored warships until the arrival of two dreadnoughts in 1910.

About
The ships had a low freeboard and long superstructures with single-gun main turrets arranged at each end. Their secondary batteries were also mounted at each end of the superstructure, albeit in casemates in each corner. All used British Armstrong guns.

In 1912, both ships were overhauled with new propulsion and armament. In 1924, Brazil sold Marshal Deodoro to the Mexican Navy. She served for another 14 years, primarily as a training vessel.

Deodoro-class coast-defense ships
 Deodoro (sold to Mexico and commissioned as the Anáhuac)
 Floriano (scrapped)

References

Bibliography

External links 

Coastal defense ship classes
Marshal Deodoro-class coastal defense ship